The first season of The Challenge: All Stars premiered on Paramount+ on April 1, 2021. The season featured twenty-two past cast members of the main series competing for $500,000.

Contestants

Casting
Several potential cast members were asked to appear with some being chosen as alternates and flown out to Argentina for the entirety of production. Alternates included Casey Cooper & Ryan Kehoe of the Fresh Meat season of The Challenge, Sophia Pasquis from Road Rules: The Quest, Heather Cooke from 2011's The Real World: Las Vegas, and Cohutta Grindstaff of The Real World: Sydney.

Format
All Stars features a daily challenge, nomination process and an elimination round.
Daily Challenge: Players compete in the main challenge either individually or in teams. For team challenges, teams elect a male and female captain before the challenge begins.  The winning player (for individual challenges), or winning team captain (for team challenges) of the designated gender is immune from elimination while the respective losing captain or player of the designated gender is automatically sent into the elimination round. 
Nominations: Players besides the captains of the winning and losing teams (for team challenges), or both individual winners and the last-place player (for individual challenges), participate in nominations to select a second player of the designated gender to compete in the elimination round. They are given a chance to discuss the nominations before voting in an open vote. The player who receives the most votes will participate in the elimination round.
Eliminations (The Arena): The nominated player participates in an elimination round against the same-gender captain of the losing team, or the last place player from the daily challenge depending on the structure of the daily challenge. The winner remains in the game while the loser is eliminated.

Starting at the 5th episode, it was announced that the remaining eliminations for the season would be double eliminations in which two players are eliminated. The losing male and female players, or captains, from the daily challenge form a team. The nominated player must then call-out a partner of the opposite gender to form their opponents for the elimination; the gender of the nominated player alternates each episode. The winning team remains in the game while the losing team is eliminated.

Twists
Lifesaver: Implemented for the first four episodes, the winning player or winning team captain of the non-designated gender for the elimination round is granted the Lifesaver. At the Arena, they must choose whether or not to use the Lifesaver to save the nominated player from competing in the elimination. In the event that the Lifesaver is used, the players eligible to vote (this time excluding the saved nominee) must publicly vote to select a replacement nominee for the Arena.

Gameplay

Challenge games
Deep Blue Dive: Played in two teams of eleven, teams solve a series of math equations one at a time. After solving an equation, one player must swim and dive to collect a cubic puzzle piece with the answer printed on it. Teams continue this process until they collect all eleven puzzle pieces, and each team player must enter the water at least once. If a player is unable to collect a puzzle piece, or collects an incorrect puzzle piece, their team is assigned a five-minute penalty and another player must collect the puzzle piece instead. The first team to collect all eleven puzzle pieces and solve the final equation wins. 
Winners: Arissa, Beth, Big Easy, Darrell, Jemmye, Jisela, Kendal, Nehemiah, Teck, Trishelle & Yes
Ancient Challenge History: Played in male and female heats, players begin on a structure above water with three platforms in front of them. One at a time, players are asked a question about previous seasons of The Challenge. If they answer incorrectly, they must step onto the next platform. Each subsequent platform is able to withstand less weight than the previous one. Players are eliminated from the challenge if they fall through a platform that cannot withstand their weight or reach the third and final platform. The last player of each gender standing wins, while the first female to fall into the water is automatically sent into elimination.
Winners: Aneesa & Nehemiah
Melt Away: Played in five teams of four, teams must use their bodies to melt through two giant blocks of ice and collect four shields frozen inside. After an extended period of time, teams are given two hammers to assist them. Teams are issued a five-minute penalty for any shields they break. Once teams collect all four shields, they return to their station to find six additional shields, each with a previous season of The Challenge printed on it. The first team to place all ten seasons in chronological order wins.
Winners:  Darrell, KellyAnne, Kendal & Syrus
On the Ropes: Played in four teams of five, with two teams playing at a time. Teams begin on opposite platforms above water. Each team has a set of five ropes that connect the two platforms. One team member at a time must cross their ropes to reach the opposite platform before returning to their platform. Once back, they may unclip one of their opponent's ropes. Players are eliminated from the challenge if they fall in the water. The process continues until one team has unclipped all of their opponent's ropes. The team that unclips the most ropes the fastest wins. 
Winners: Aneesa, Derrick, Mark, Ruthie & Yes
Connect Em All: Beginning in three teams of six, teams complete their first checkpoint which involves solving a series of math equations, where the solutions correspond to letters that form a phrase. Once complete, teams must then carry a heavy log uphill to the second checkpoint and disband into male-female pairs. The second checkpoint requires pairs to replicate a memory board using colored tiles.  Once complete, pairs disband to compete as individuals and must carry a smaller log downhill to the finish line. The first male and female to cross the finish line wins while the last male and female to cross the finish line are automatically sent into elimination.
Winners: Kendal & Laterrian
Escape the Room: Played in four teams of four, with two teams playing at once. Teams begin in a container above water with each team member standing on a trapdoor in front of their puzzle. Each member must solve their puzzle before their trapdoor opens. At pre-determined intervals, the trapdoors open, dropping one team member into the water each time.  The team with the most puzzles solved wins. 
Winners: Big Easy, Jonna, Laterrian & Ruthie
Rib Cage Pass: Two players at a time begin harnessed on opposite sides of a speeding truck. They must cross a series of beams attached to the truck and collect a ball at the opposite end, before returning across the beams to deposit the ball. Players continue this process until they collect all four balls or reach the time-limit. The male and female with the most balls collected win while the male and female with the least balls collected are automatically sent into elimination. In the event that multiple players are unable to collect a ball, the losing player is determined by the number of beams traversed. 
Winners: KellyAnne & Mark

Arena games
Pole Wrestle: Players begin at the center of the Arena and place both hands on a metal pole. The first player to wrestle the pole out of their opponent's hands twice wins.
Played by: Ace vs. Laterrian
Knot So Fast: Players have 20 minutes to create as many knots as they can using a 200-foot rope within an octagonal structure. After those 20 minutes are up, players switch positions and must untie their opponent's knots. The first player to untie their opponent's knots and place the rope inside their circle wins.
Played by: Kendal vs. Trishelle
Going out of Tile: Prior to the challenge, players must consume two Carolina Reaper peppers. On T.J's go, players must run inside an open structure with tiles inserted inside of the frames. They must break all of their corresponding colored tiles, including the tiles on the roof,  before returning to their starting circle. The first player to return to the start wins.
Played by: Nehemiah vs. Teck
Wall Ball: Players begin with four walls connected to a rope and must pull the rope to separate the walls. Once separated, they must throw a ball over the first wall and punch their way through the wall, continuing this process with all four walls. The first player to punch through all four walls wins.
Over and Under: Teams begin with four walls connected to a rope and must pull the rope to separate the walls. Once separated, one teammate must throw a ball over the first wall and punch their way through the walls, while their partner must climb over the walls before depositing their ball at the end. Teams repeat this process five times. The first team to deposit all five balls wins.
Played by: Alton & Aneesa vs. Beth & Syrus
Pull Me Over: Team members begin on a stump across from their opponent of the same gender, with a rope in between them. They must pull their opponent off the stump, or retrieve all the rope to win their matchup.  If both team members win their matchup, their team is awarded a point. The first team to two points wins.
Played by: Katie & Laterrian vs. Kendal & Mark
Ring Cling: Teams must release ten rings, connected to each other by chains, from a nine-foot pole. Once released, teams attach the rings to pegs in a wall to assemble a ladder, and climb to ring the bell at the top. The first team to ring their bell wins.
Played by: Big Easy & Jisela vs. Kendal & Nehemiah

Final Challenge
It was announced that players would complete a series of checkpoints in male-female pairs to earn points based on their placements. The player with the greatest total points at the end of the Final Challenge is declared the winner and will receive $500,000. Additionally, the last pair to reach the second checkpoint is eliminated.

The first pair to complete each checkpoint receives 5 points each; second receives 4 points; third receives 3 points; fourth receives 2 points; fifth receives 1 point. After each checkpoint, members from the winning pair choose a player of the opposite gender (that they haven't already partnered with) as their partner for the next checkpoint. The process continues with the next-highest ranked players from the previous checkpoint choosing their teammate from the remaining unpaired players.

Day One
Checkpoint #1: Players individually complete a triangular geometric puzzle. Once a male and female player complete their puzzle, they pair up and must paddle a canoe across a lake to the next checkpoint. The last team to reach the next checkpoint is eliminated.
Eliminated: Derrick & Jisela (11th place)
Checkpoint #2 & #3 (Part 1): Teams must assemble two bicycles and, while tethered together, ride them towards a puzzle board. At the puzzle board, they must solve two pentagram-shaped puzzles so that the numbers on the five points have the same sum.
Checkpoint #3 (Part 2): Teams must run up an elevating path while tethered together to reach the next checkpoint.
Checkpoint #4: Each team member must consume two Carolina Reaper peppers and solve a puzzle before proceeding along a path to the next checkpoint.
Checkpoint #5 and Overnight Stage: Each team member must consume a serving of barbecued offal to complete the checkpoint. For the Overnight Stage, players remain with their partner from Checkpoint #5. One team member may sleep at a time on the end of a large seesaw while their partner stands on the other end to level the apparatus. If the player standing falls or steps off, they must switch places with their partner.

Day Two
Final Leg (Checkpoint #6): As individuals, players must race to the top of a mountain where the finish line is located. It was announced that the checkpoint was worth "double points" where the first player to reach the top receives ten points, the second player receives nine points and so on with the tenth player receiving one point. After each player has reached the top, the results are announced. The player with the most points is declared the winner of All Stars and receives $500,000.
 Winner: Yes (31 points)
 Runner-up: Darrell (29 points)
 Third Place: Jonna and KellyAnne (24 points)
 Fifth Place: Mark (22 points)
 Sixth Place: Alton (20 points) 
 Seventh Place: Jemmye and Ruthie (17 points)
 Ninth Place: Aneesa (13 points)
 Tenth Place: Big Easy (9 points)

Game summary

Elimination Chart

Episode Progress

Competition
 The contestant won the final challenge
 The contestant did not win the final challenge
 The contestant did not finish the final challenge
 The contestant won the challenge as a team captain, or individually, and was granted immunity from the Arena
 The contestant won the challenge as a team captain, or individually, and was granted the Life Saver
 The contestant won the challenge, but was not granted immunity from the Arena or the Life Saver
 The contestant was not selected for the Arena
 The contestant was a losing team captain at the challenge, but did not have to compete in the Arena
 The contestant won the elimination in the Arena
 The contestant was selected for the Arena, but did not have to compete
 The contestant was voted into the Arena, but was saved by the Lifesaver
 The contestant lost in the Arena and was eliminated
 The contestant won the challenge, but was selected for the Arena, lost and was eliminated
 The contestant withdrew from the competition

Final Challenge scoreboard

Voting progress

Team selections
 Bold indicates team captains

Episodes

Reunion special
The Reunion special aired on June 3, 2021, and was hosted by former NFL player Nate Burleson and entertainment personality Maria Menounos. The cast members who attended the reunion were: Yes, Darrell, Jonna, KellyAnne, Mark, Jemmye, Big Easy, Derrick, Jisela and Beth.

Reception
Decider described the season as "pretty entertaining" and also enjoyable for fans who hadn't watched the original show since its early days.

Awards
The season was nominated by the Guild of Music Supervisors Awards for Best Music Supervision in Reality Television.

Notes

References

2021 American television seasons
All Stars, The Challenge
Television shows set in Argentina
Television shows filmed in Argentina